Wally Shearer (29 September 1918 – 29 May 2000) was  a former Australian rules footballer who played with Footscray in the Victorian Football League (VFL).

Notes

External links 
		

1918 births
2000 deaths
Australian rules footballers from Victoria (Australia)
Western Bulldogs players